Samuel S. Bloom (Hebrew: שמואל (סם) שמעון בלום) (December 25, 1860 - October 10, 1941) was a U.S. Jewish Zionist leader and industrialist and innovator in the field of dentures.

Biography
Bloom was born in Vilkomir, Russian Empire (nowadays Ukmergė, Lithuania), into a religious Jewish family. In 1882, he immigrated to United States of America. He established a plant manufacturing dentures in Philadelphia  and was a member of the American Jewish Committee and the American Jewish Congress and attended the World Zionist Congress.

In 1926, he immigrated to Palestine. Bloom built the "Ohel Shem" house in 1928 in the cultural center of Tel Aviv, for the benefit of his friend, the poet Hayim Nahman Bialik, particularly for the dissemination of knowledge of Judaism in all its branches.

Bloom died on September 10, 1941, and was buried in the Trumpeldor Cemetery in Tel Aviv.
The singer Danny Maseng And the poet Amichai Chasson are his great-grandson.

Further reading 
 Samuel S. Bloom, Samuel S. Bloom - My Memories, Published by Palestine Publishing Company, Tel-Aviv, 1938
 David De Vries, From Porcelain to Plastic: politics and Business in a Relocated False Teeth Company, 1880s-1950s, Enterprise & Society: The International Journal of Business History, 14, 1, 2013, 144-181.

References 

1860 births
1941 deaths
Jews in Mandatory Palestine
American Zionists
Burials at Trumpeldor Cemetery